Parashorea is a genus of plant in family Dipterocarpaceae. The name Parashorea is derived from Greek (para = similar to) and refers to the genus similarity to Shorea. 
It contains about 15 species distributed from South Myanmar, Thailand, Indo-China and the southernmost parts of China to Sumatra, Borneo and the Philippines.

Parashorea trees have hard wood, can reach heights exceeding 70 metres, and have limbs reaching outward over ten metres. White seraya is a common name for several Parashorea species used in the timber trade.

Species
Species include:
 Parashorea aptera Sloot
 Parashorea buchananii (C.E.C.Fisch.) Symington
 Parashorea chinensis Wang Hsie
 Parashorea densiflora Slooten & Sym.
 Parashorea dussaudii Tardieu
 Parashorea globosa Sym.
 Parashorea laotica Tardieu
 Parashorea lucida (Miq.) Kurz
 Parashorea macrophylla Wyatt-Sm. ex P.S.Ashton
 Parashorea malaanonan (Blanco) Merr.
 Parashorea parvifolia Wyatt-Sm. ex P.S.Ashton
 Parashorea stellata Kurz
 Parashorea smythiesii Wyatt-Sm. ex P.S.Ashton
 Parashorea tomentella (Symington) Meijer
 Parashorea warburgii Brandis

See also
Dipterocarp timber classification

 
Malvales genera
Taxonomy articles created by Polbot
Taxa named by Wilhelm Sulpiz Kurz